Robert Greyndore (died 1443) was the member of Parliament for the constituency of Gloucestershire for the parliaments of 1417, 1420, 1426, and 1433.

References 

Members of the Parliament of England for Gloucestershire
English MPs 1420
Year of birth unknown
1443 deaths
English MPs 1417
English MPs 1426
English MPs 1433